The London Conference on Libya was an international meeting of government representatives in London on 29 March 2011 to discuss intervention in the Libyan Civil War on behalf of the National Transitional Council. Attendees included foreign ministers and leaders from the United Nations, the League of Arab States, the Organisation of Islamic Cooperation, the European Union and NATO. The meeting was chaired by the British Foreign Secretary William Hague. While leaders of the Libyan opposition including Mahmoud Jibril were consulted prior to the conference, they did not attend.

The meeting resulted in the setting up of the Libya Contact Group, which served as an organizational basis for intervention in Libya until the overthrow of Muammar Gaddafi in August 2011.

See also 

Libya Contact Group
Libyan Civil War

References 

First Libyan Civil War
Foreign relations of Libya
Diplomatic conferences in the United Kingdom
21st-century diplomatic conferences
2011 in international relations
2011 in the United Kingdom
Conferences in London
2011 conferences
2011 in London
2010s in the City of Westminster